Trodd is an English surname. Notable people with this surname include:

 John Trodd (1828–1858), English cricket player
 Kenith Trodd (born 1936), British television producer
 Thomas Trodd (1842–1908), English cricket player
 William Trodd (1836–1880), English cricket player